The 2nd constituency of Jura is a French legislative constituency in the Jura département.

Description

The 2nd constituency of Jura covers the south east of the department. With a thinly spread population it reaches into the Jura mountains from the centre of the department.

The seat is held by the conservative LR and has been in the hands of the right since 1988.

Deputies

Election results

2022

2017

2012

Sources

Official results of French elections from 2002: "Résultats électoraux officiels en France" (in French).

2